Toyo may refer to:

Places 
Tōyō, Kōchi, a town in Japan
Tōyo, Ehime, a former city in Japan
Toyo Province, a Japanese province divided in 683

Tōyō, Kumamoto, a village located in Yatsuhiro District, Kumamoto, Japan
Tōyō, Tokyo, a neighborhood in Koto, Tokyo.

People
 Mr. Toyo (stagename) ringname of wrestler Rusher Kimura
 Ms. Toyo (stagename) Bogli Leader Katchii

Given name 
Toyo Ito (born 1941), Japanese architect
Toyo Mitunobu (1897–1944), Japanese rear admiral
Sesshū Tōyō (1420–1506), Japanese master of ink and wash painting
, Japanese poet
, Japanese samurai
Toyo (queen), Queen of Yamataikoku

Surname 
Javier Toyo (born 1977), Venezuelan football goalkeeper
Mohamed Khir Toyo (born 1965), former Dato' Menteri Besar (Chief Minister) of the state of Selangor in Malaysia

Corporations 
Toyo Engineering Corporation, an engineering, procurement and construction company serving mainly the hydrocarbons and petrochemical sectors worldwide
Toyo Tires, a tire company based in Japan
Toyo Kogyo, Japanese carmaker known since 1984 as Mazda

Other uses 
Toyo University, a university with several branches in Japan
Toyo College of Food Technology, a private junior college in Kawanishi, Hyōgo, Japan
Tōyō Rapid Railway Line, a commuter rail line owned by Tōyō Rapid Railway Co., Ltd.
Tōyō kanji, the official form of kanji or Japanese written characters from 1946 to 1981
Toyo, the largest size of Siku, a traditional big bass pan flute from the Andes
Toyo Harada, a Valiant Comics character
Toyo, a soy sauce-based product popular in the Philippines
Toyo straw, a shiny, smooth straw made in Japan from rice paper and used for fedora hats

See also

 
 
 

Japanese unisex given names